Tomáš Hubočan (born 17 September 1985) is a Slovak professional footballer who plays as a defender for Cypriot club Karmiotissa.

He made his senior international debut in 2006. He has gone on to make 73 appearances for Slovakia, representing his nation at the UEFA Euro 2016 and the UEFA Euro 2020 tournaments. He retired as 9th most capped international footballer in December 2021.

Club career

MŠK Žilina
Hubočan began in MŠK Žilina since his youth years, beyond the time when he was on loan in ViOn Zlaté Moravce since January 2006 until June 2006. After the end of loan he came back to Žilina and he worked up for one of the best defenders in Corgoň Liga. In the 2006–07 season, he won the league with Šošoni.

Zenit
Hubočan signed for Zenit on 11 February 2008 on a three-year contract for €3.8 million, the highest ever paid to a Slovak club.  Hubočan is hoped to fill the vacancy in the center of Zenit's defense created by fellow Slovak defender Martin Škrtel being sold to Liverpool.

As Zenit's star center-backs Ivica Križanac and Nicolas Lombaerts were still on the injured list, and defenders Kim Dong-Jin and Roman Shirokov were not quite ready to make their comebacks, Hubočan received his first taste of Champions League football against Real Madrid (at the Petrovsky stadium) on 30 September 2008. Only having played a total of 11 games for Zenit, it was a rude awakening as he conceded a disastrous own-goal in the 4th minute.

Having only played in 22 league games over two seasons, Hubočan was not quite trusted by former head coaches Dick Advocaat and Anatoli Davydov. He finally broke through to the starting eleven in 2010 under Italian Luciano Spalletti, winning the competition for the unfamiliar left back spot over the likes of Michael Lumb and Radek Šírl. Spalletti rated Hubočan as a hot prospect for the future.

On 30 September 2010, he scored his first goal for Zenit in a UEFA Europa League match against AEK Athens F.C.

Trabzonspor
On 7 September 2017, he joined Turkish club Trabzonspor on loan.

Omonia 
On 4 September 2019, Hubočan joined Omonia on a one-year deal. He would later sign 2 one-year extensions, thus staying at the club until 2022.

During his time at Omonia, Hubočan won the domestic league, the Cup, and the Super Cup. He also helped the club reach the group stage of a European competition for the first time in its history, competing in the group stage of the 2020–21 Europa League and the 2021–22 Europa Conference League.

International career
Hubočan played his first international match for Slovakia against United Arab Emirates on 11 December 2006. He was a part of Slovakia's squad for the country's first European Championship tournament in 2016.

Hubočan announced his national team retirement on 22 February 2019, at age 33 along with another national team defender and captain Martin Škrtel and forward Adam Nemec. The trio shared a farewell game on 13 October 2019 in a friendly against Paraguay, which coincided with a national team return to Tehelné pole, after 10 years. Although Nemec and Škrtel had starred from the start of the game, Hubočan only entered the game symbolically in the 87th minute, due to a sprain. He entered with the game at 1–1. Ironically, this was Hubočan's first international game at the famed Slovakian stadium, home to the national team for a number of years. The game concluded in the same score.

In November 2020, he came out of retirement, playing in the UEFA Euro 2020 qualifying play-offs clinching game against Northern Ireland. In June 2021, he was included in the final 26-man roster for the rescheduled UEFA Euro 2020 tournament. After Slovakia failed to qualify for the 2022 FIFA World Cup, Hubočan announced his second and definitive retirement in an interview with Denník Šport, citing age and family commitments as main motivations.

Career statistics

Honours
MŠK Žilina
Slovak Super Liga: 2003–04, 2006–07

Zenit St. Petersburg
Russian Premier League: 2010, 2011–12
Russian Cup: 2009–10
Russian Super Cup: 2008, 2011

Omonia
 Cypriot First Division: 2020–21
 Cypriot Super Cup: 2021
 Cypriot Cup: 2021–22

Slovakia
King's Cup: 2018

References

External links
 Profile at the official FC Zenit St. Petersburg website 
 
 MŠK Žilina players
 

1985 births
Living people
Sportspeople from Žilina
Association football defenders
Slovak footballers
Slovak expatriate footballers
Slovakia international footballers
MŠK Žilina players
FC ViOn Zlaté Moravce players
FC Zenit Saint Petersburg players
FC Dynamo Moscow players
Olympique de Marseille players
Trabzonspor footballers
AC Omonia players
Karmiotissa FC players
Slovak Super Liga players
Russian Premier League players
Ligue 1 players
Süper Lig players
Cypriot First Division players
UEFA Euro 2016 players
UEFA Euro 2020 players
Slovak expatriate sportspeople in Russia
Slovak expatriate sportspeople in France
Slovak expatriate sportspeople in Turkey
Slovak expatriate sportspeople in Cyprus
Expatriate footballers in Russia
Expatriate footballers in France
Expatriate footballers in Turkey
Expatriate footballers in Cyprus